Passais (also: Passais-la-Conception) is a former commune in the Orne department in north-western France. On 1 January 2016, it was merged into the new commune of Passais Villages.

Facilities in the village include a doctors’ surgery (with nurses), a pharmacy, a boulangerie, two hairdressers, a Tabac, two banks,  a boucherie, and a bar / restaurant. There is also soon to open a new clothing business, Desirabilitees, which specializes in printed T shirts and workwear.

There is also a médiathèque (library), a theatre, a Marie, a salles des fêtes, and schools.

Petrol and diesel is available from a 24-hour commune filling station, which is alongside a Vehicle workshop (Top Garage).

There is a small market on a Tuesday morning.

See also 

 Communes of the Orne department

References 

Former communes of Orne